Saltsjöbanan is an electrified suburban rail system between Stockholm and Saltsjöbaden in Nacka, Sweden. An average of 17,200 boardings are made on an ordinary workday (2019). The line is mostly single-track (with passing loops between Nacka and Saltsjö-Järla, and between Storängen and Saltsjö-Duvnäs), and is isolated from Sweden's national railway network, although both are built to compatible . The Storstockholms Lokaltrafik (SL) classifies it as "light rail" in its maps.

From January 2023 into spring 2024, the complete Saltsjöbanan is planned to be closed for reconstruction, after the westernmost section from Henriksdal to Slussen has already been suspended since 2016.

History
K.A. Wallenberg largely initiated and financed the project. The railway's initial purpose was to offer a quick way for stressed-out Stockholm residents to get to planned beaches and recreational facilities around Saltsjöbaden. The construction of the railway went faster than expected, but turned out to be very expensive, mostly owing to the problems building the last stretch into the city, which involved a lot of tedious work with explosives to even out the ground and to build two long tunnels, one of which was the country's longest at the time of the construction. This sudden increase in costs led the tunnels to be nicknamed "Wallenberg's downfall" for a while afterwards.

Saltsjöbanan was inaugurated on 1 July 1893 and was operated with steam locomotives until 1910 after which the lines were gradually electrified (circa 1 kV DC). The construction of the branch that runs from Igelboda to Solsidan (also called Vårgärdsbanan) was fully contracted to a Danish company, Brøchner-Larsen & Krogh. The branch opened in 1913.

Initially the railway was operated by Järnvägs AB Stockholm-Saltsjön, and carried a great deal of profitable freight traffic. This diminished with time, and by the 1960s it was no longer breaking even, and a complete closure was considered. However, the Stockholm County Council took over the line in 1969, and today it is owned by Storstockholms Lokaltrafik (SL).

To this day, the route remains mostly unchanged since the early 1900s, but has seen slight alterations at its outer ends. A railway branch also used to go from slightly west of Östervik to a gravel pit in Snörom, a distance of about 3 km. It was however only used for industrial purposes. The branch was decommissioned as early as 1902 and all that remains today is a minor road with the same stretch. A Culemeyer trailer is stored a railway siding linked to the passing track near Storängen Station.

Until 2000, Saltsjöbanan also used to be connected to the Swedish national railway network via the Southern Main Line (link decommissioned 1954) as well as the Södra station–Hammarbyhamnen–Stadsgården freight branch line (sv:Industrispåret Södra station–Hammarbyhamnen–Stadsgården), which provided a connection to Stockholm South Station.

Due to the Slussen reconstruction project, the section between Henriksdal and Slussen was closed in 2016, making Henriksdal the temporary western terminus with a rail replacement bus running there. The line will be reopened when the reconstruction of Slussen is finished, possibly in 2026.

From January 2023 into Spring 2024, the complete Saltsjöbanan will be closed, with trains being replaced by buses. During the 15-month-closure, passing loops will be added at Fisksätra and Tattby stops, Värmdovägen road bridge near Sickla stop will be rebuilt and Sickla stop itself is modified to provide passenger interchange to Stockholm Tunnelbana's future Blå linje branch to Nacka.

Vehicles and technology

As of 2015, the trains running on Saltsjöbanan are EMU sets of two or three cars, consisting of models C10 (with motor) and C11 (motorless). These trains were manufactured by ASEA between 1975 and 1976. The cars are slight modifications to the C8 stock used on the Stockholm metro. Maximum allowed speed is 70 km/h (43 mph).

The railroad did not feature automatic train control (ATC), in contrast to most other rail traffic in Sweden, until 2019, when it was implemented after three years of construction and training. The lack of ATC made overruns such as the 2013 Saltsjöbanan train crash more likely to occur, eventually leading to the implementation of ATC. A refurbished C6 train cascaded from the Stockholm metro was therefore used to replace the damaged train as a result. As of 2022, ATC is fully implemented, with all the drivers retrained and all trains being refurbished to fit the new system, which has them now automatically braking at red signals, among the other additions to safety that come with ATC, thus making accidents such as the January 2013 one much less likely to happen.

In addition, two preserved wooden train carriages manufactured by ASEA between 1912 and 1913 are used on special occasions and can also be rented out for private events. These wooden train carriages previously served as the main rolling stock on the Saltsjöbanan until the C10 and C11 trains were introduced in 1976.

New, modern rolling stock is planned to be introduced during the second half of the 2020s, with some of the older C10/C11 trains planned to be kept while the others are due to be scrapped.

Accidents and incidents

In the early morning hours of 15 January 2013, a passenger train started to move without authorization, with only a cleaner on board. At maximum speed, it violently overran a set of buffer stops and crashed into a block of flats in Saltsjöbaden.
The cleaner was first suspected of having stolen the train, but was later cleared of blame, as the train was then considered to have started moving due to some train malfunction and violation of safety procedures.

Lines

The main line runs from Slussen to Saltsjöbaden, while a branch line connects the intermediate station Igelboda to Solsidan. There is a rail replacement bus line 25B connecting Slussen and Henriksdal while the reconstruction of Slussen is in progress.

The line is predominantly single track with passing loops at some stations. There are two longer sections of double track between Nacka - Saltsjö-Järla and Storängen - Saltsjö-Duvnäs totalling  which reduces delays waiting for trains in the opposite direction. The Solsidan branch is entirely single track.

References

External links 
2021 Simplified Saltsjöbanan line map (pdf)

Rail transport in Stockholm
Railway lines opened in 1893
Standard gauge railways in Sweden
1893 establishments in Sweden